Seymon Deutsch (May 18, 1935 – June 12, 2013) was an American bridge player. He started playing bridge as a student at the Trinity University in San Antonio, Texas, alongside Bobby Wolff, but afterwards focused on a career in business. He returned to competitive bridge in 1980s, when he started gaining successes, which include titles in Grand National Teams (1986), the Spingold Knockout Teams (1991) and three Vanderbilt Knockout Teams (1994, 1996 and 2006). He won two world titles: the 1988 World Team Olympiad in Venice and 1994 Rosenblum Cup. Deutsch was 2007 recipient of Sidney H. Lazard Jr. Sportsmanship Award. ACBL Hall of Fame player Zia Mahmood told The New York Times at the time, "There are a few people about whom never a bad word is said ... Seymon is one of them".

Deutsch was born and spent most of his life in Laredo, Texas. He ran a fashion store chain, Joe Brand, as well as a cattle ranch with large operation in South Texas. He was survived by his wife Linda née Brand and their four children.

Bridge accomplishments

Wins
 World championships (2)
 World Team Olympiad (1) 1988
 Rosenblum Cup (1) 1994
 North American Bridge Championships (5)
 Grand National Teams (1) 1986 
 Vanderbilt (3) 1994, 1996, 2006 
 Spingold (1) 1991

Runners-up

 North American Bridge Championships
 Silodor Open Pairs (1) 1995 
 Vanderbilt (2) 1990, 1991 
 Spingold (1) 1993

References

External links
 

1935 births
2013 deaths
American contract bridge players
American businesspeople in retailing
Ranchers from Texas
Trinity University (Texas) alumni
People from Laredo, Texas